Metachroma longicolle is a species of leaf beetle. It is found in the United States and Mexico. Its length is between 2.4 and 3.4 mm.

Subspecies
There are two subspecies of M. longicolle:
 Metachroma longicolle aeneicolle Horn, 1892
 Metachroma longicolle longicolle Jacoby, 1891

References

Further reading

 

Eumolpinae
Articles created by Qbugbot
Beetles described in 1891
Taxa named by Martin Jacoby
Beetles of North America